Max Gors (January 21, 1945 – February 27, 2014) was an American jurist.

Background
Gors was born in Viborg, South Dakota. He was the son of  Max John Gors  (1922-1999) and Muriel Genevieve (Flyger) Gors   (1921-2014). He received his bachelor's degree from Augustana College and his law degree from Drake University Law School. He served on Augustana College’s alumni council and was a member of Lutheran Memorial Church where he served as church president.

Career
Gors was assistant attorney general in Iowa. In 1971, he returned to South Dakota and worked in government as assistant attorney general, secretary of commerce, and chairman of the South Dakota Board of Pardons. In 1990, he was elected South Dakota Circuit Judge. He later served as acting associate justice of the South Dakota Supreme Court. He died in Sioux Falls, South Dakota.

Notes

1945 births
2014 deaths
People from Viborg, South Dakota
Augustana University alumni
Iowa lawyers
South Dakota state court judges
Justices of the South Dakota Supreme Court
American people of Danish descent
American Lutherans
20th-century American judges
20th-century American lawyers
20th-century Lutherans
Drake University Law School alumni